Air Vice Marshal Christina Reid Elliot,  is a retired senior Royal Air Force officer.

Military career
Educated at the University of Glasgow, Elliot joined to Royal Air Force in 1985. She became a member of the Directing Staff at the Joint Services Command and Staff College in 2006, Group Captain Airspace Control Capability at RAF Air Command in 2007 and station commander at RAF Halton in 2010. She went on to be Group Captain Programmes in Finance, Programmes and Plans at RAF Air Command in 2012.

Elliot was promoted to air commodore on 30 August 2013 and appointed assistant chief of staff training, HQ No. 22 (Training) Group. She was director of ground training at No. 22 Group from 2014, and appointed Air Secretary in 2016. She was succeeded by Air Vice-Marshal Maria Byford on 24 February 2020.

Elliot was appointed Companion of the Order of the Bath (CB) in the 2020 Birthday Honours.

Later life
Since April 2020, having retiring from the Royal Air Force, Elliot has worked as controller of the RAF Benevolent Fund.

References

 

 
 

Commanders of the Order of the British Empire
Companions of the Order of the Bath
Female air marshals of the Royal Air Force
Living people
Royal Air Force air marshals
Women in the Royal Air Force
Year of birth missing (living people)